WD 0343+247 is a white dwarf in the ecliptic constellation of Taurus. It was discovered in 1997 when examination of photographs taken for a survey of brown dwarfs in the Pleiades revealed a faint star with high proper motion. Although referred to as WD 0346+246 in the discovery paper, it is more correctly designated WD 0346+247.

Recent studies using NASA's Spitzer Space Telescope and MDM Observatory's 2.4-meter telescope (near Tucson, Arizona, USA) shows that this white dwarf (together with another one: SDSS J110217.48+411315.4) has a low (for white dwarfs) surface temperature between 3,700 and  due to it being 11 to 12 billion years old.

References

Taurus (constellation)
White dwarfs